Wolf-Eberhard Georg Felix von Lewinski (2 June 1927 – 23 March 2003) was a German music and theatre critic. He studied violin, piano, trombone, conducting, theatre and opera direction, but turned to musical criticism early. He was chief critic for papers in the Rhein Main area, and worked for several newspapers and broadcasters. He wrote biographies of singers such as Dietrich Fischer-Dieskau and Brigitte Fassbaender, and created television portraits of pianists such as Claudio Arrau  and Wilhelm Kempff. He was also an academic lecturer of musical criticism.

Life

Youth and study 
Von Lewinski was born in Berlin, the son of the bank director Ernst-Alfred von Lewinski. He contracted a heart disease after finishing school in 1944 as an Luftwaffenhelfer, which led to his suspension from military service. In autumn 1944, he was therefore able to study music at the Musikhochschule Dresden, with a focus on violin, which he extended after the Second World War to include conductor training with Walther Meyer-Giesow, Hermann Abendroth and Joseph Keilberth. He also studied trombone, piano, conducting and opera directing as well as theatre, literature and art history.

Conductor and artistic director 
In 1948 he made his first public appearance as a conductor and subsequently conducted, among others, the Eisenach Philharmonic Orchestra and the Dresdner Philharmonie. Towards the end of his professional career, Lewinski was intendant of the Staatsphilharmonie Rheinland-Pfalz from 1983 to 1992. During his leadership, the orchestra played new concert series, with soloists such as Claudio Arrau and Krystian Zimerman, and played at new locations such as Frankfurt-Feste, Ludwigsburger Schlossfestspiele, in Vienna, the Royal Albert Hall in London, and on tours to Spain, Sweden and Poland.

Music critic and author 
More important than his only brief musical activity was Lewinski's work as music critic after 1947. He also worked for the Süddeutsche Zeitung,  and Westermanns Monatshefte] and wrote radio features for various broadcasting companies. Since 1971, von Lewinski has worked for the ZDF and the Saarländischer Rundfunk. In 1978, Lewinski took over the position of chief music critic at the Verlagsgruppe Rhein-Main of several papers in the region.

Teaching 
In 1979, Lewinski began teaching at the Musikhochschule Köln and at Dr. Hoch's Konservatorium in Frankfurt as the head of the seminar Music Criticism and Comparative Interpretation Studies. He gave courses in Hanover, Munich, at the Herbsttage Iserlohn and at the Tage Alter Musik in Innsbruck.

Lewinsky died in Calw at the age of 75.

Family 
Lewinski was married and had three daughters, some of whom also took up an artistic profession.

Awards and memberships 
 Golden Order of Merit of the Province of Salzburg
 Member of the 
 Member of the Rhineland-Palatinate State Music Council
 Member of the board of the Frankfurter Bachkonzerte association
 2000: Gutenberg Plaque of Mainz

Work 
Musician's biographies by von Lewinski are held by the German National Library:

 Ludwig Hoelscher, 1967, Verlag Hans Schneider Tutzing
 Musik – wieder gefragt, 1967, Claassen-Verlag, Düsseldorf
 Artur Rubinstein, 1967 Rembrandt-Verlag. Berlin
 Anneliese Rothenberger, 1968, Friedrich-Verlag, Velber
 Joseph Keilberth, 1968, Rembrandt-Verlag, Berlin
 Andor Foldes, 1970, Rembrandt-Verlag, Berlin
 Gideon Kremer, 1982, W. Goldmann Verlag and Schott, Mainz
 Dietrich Fischer-Dieskau, 1988, Piper, Munich, and Schott
 Peter Schreier, 1992, Piper and Schott
 Brigitte Fassbaender, 1999, Atlantis and Schott

References

Further reading 
 Rita Wilhelm: Gedanken zur Musikkritik. Festschrift zum 75. Geburtstag von Wolf-Eberhard von Lewinski. IKS Garamond, Jena 2002, .

External links 
 
 
 

German music critics
German theatre critics
Academic staff of the Hochschule für Musik und Tanz Köln
German conductors (music)
1927 births
2003 deaths
Writers from Berlin
Luftwaffenhelfer